Hayate The Combat Butler is a Taiwanese television drama based on the Japanese shōnen manga of the same name by Kenjiro Hata. It originally aired on the free-to-air channel FTV from June 19 to September 11, 2011 and on the cable channel GTV Variety Show from June 25 to September 17, 2011.

Synopsis
"Xiao Sa" Ling Qisa is an unlucky teenager who worked since childhood to make ends meet due to his parents' irresponsible behavior. On that Christmas Day, he got fired from both his daytime and nighttime jobs, and also finds out that his parents were running from the mafia, leaving behind a massive gambling debt on his shoulders. They even collected his last pay from his nighttime job's boss to escape. While running away from the debt collectors, he ends up meeting Xiao Zhi. From his encounter with the mafia, they said that he didn't even have the guts to be a bad guy as he didn't dare pick up the knife and kill them (to relieve him of his debt). Hence, Xiao Sa thought that since being a filial son and good student didn't help him at all, he should just be a bad guy and kidnap a rich heir/heiress and demand ransom to pay off his debts. However, due to some misunderstandings, he ended up saving Xiao Zhi from a few thugs who tried to pick her up. Xiao Zhi thought that he was confessing as Xiao Sa said that he needed her (literally) when in fact he meant that he needed her to agree to him kidnapping her. However, as he went to call Xiao Zhi's family to demand ransom, he backed out at the last moment. During the process, kidnappers came and captured Xiao Zhi while Xiao Sa was away making the call. Xiao Sa then risked his life to save her, and Xiao Zhi ended up hiring him as her butler, and slowly fell in love with him; not always noticing how much he influenced her and how she overcame many of her fears with his help.

Aside from performing his ordinary duties as a butler, Xiao Sa must fight to protect Xiao Zhi from harm - a difficult task since her life is always in danger as she is the target of other individuals coveting her family's fortune - and sometimes deal with some extravagant requests from her, oblivious to Xiao Zhi's true feelings for him. In the later part of the story, Xiao Sa has to deal with other issues that come his way, many of which ends up with some comedic scenes, also romantic ones where Xiao Sa gave encouragement to Xiao Zhi about her dream of drawing manga, and his unknowing care for her along with his unbending loyalty towards her. Xiao Sa's debt was eventually paid by Xiao Zhi, and he vows to serve her with his life. As the story progresses, Xiao Sa also had to deal with some of his past, and of course, competition with other guys who were in love with Xiao Zhi - some of which have their own charm.

Cast

Music
 Opening theme song: "別問我" (Don't Ask Me)
Performed by 韋禮安 (William Wei)
Lyrics by: 韋禮安 (William Wei)
Composed by: 韋禮安 (William Wei)

 Ending theme song: "單邊耳機" (One Sided Earphone)
Performed by 胡宇崴 (George Hu) & Aggie Xie
Lyrics by: 葉樹賢 (Ye Shu Xian)
Composed by: 易桀齊 (Yi Jie Qi)

Insert songs
 "Turn Around"
Performed by Shirley
Lyrics by: 戴蕙心 (Dai Hu Xin)
Composed by: 戴蕙心 (Dai Hu Xin)

 "夜" (Night)
Performed by 曾静玟 (Zeng Jing Wen)
Lyrics by: 林蔚利  (Lin Wei Li)
Composed by: 李華章 (Lee Hua Chang)

Broadcast

Reception

References

External links
 FTV "Hayate the Combat Butler" official site
 GTV "Hayate the Combat Butler" official site
- Songwriting credits

Formosa Television original programming
Gala Television original programming
2011 Taiwanese television series debuts
2011 Taiwanese television series endings
Hayate the Combat Butler
Taiwanese television dramas based on manga